WFTN-FM (Mix 94.1 FM) is a radio station based in central New Hampshire which airs a CHR music format. Broadcasting with 6,000 watts from Calef Hill in Tilton, the station's signal is perfectly situated to cover Central New Hampshire, including the cities of Laconia, Concord, and Franklin and nearby communities. Mix 94.1 FM is the heritage CHR in both the Lake Winnipesaukee Region and Concord areas, being one of the few stations in New Hampshire staffed with live and local air personalities during the day.

The station is owned by Northeast Communications, a local broadcasting company owned by Jeff Fisher.  Sister stations to WFTN-FM are WFTN (AM), WPNH AM–FM, and WSCY.

WFTN-FM signed on the air in 1987 as an adult contemporary station, "94 FM". Over the years, the station evolved into a CHR station. Longtime Mix 94.1 air personalities include Fred Caruso and news director Amy Bates, Tara Madison, "Mower", and weekends with Gary Ford and Gavin Martin. Mix 94.1 FM is the local affiliate for Liveline with Mason Kelter on weeknights and Open House Party which they have carried on weekends since 1990.

The station streams its signal over the internet, as of December 2022.

Former logo

External links

FTN-FM
Contemporary hit radio stations in the United States
Radio stations established in 1987
1987 establishments in New Hampshire
Franklin, New Hampshire